There are four Geordie song-related lists on Wikipedia:

 List of Geordie songwriters
 List of Geordie singers
 List of Geordie songbooks
 List of Geordie characters, events and places

Geordie songwriters